El Cazador was a CrossGen comic book title set in the Sigilverse, CrossGen's shared universe. Whereas most Sigilverse titles were set in the far future, El Cazador took place on Earth during the Golden Age of Piracy of the 17th century. Additionally, El Cazador lacks the magical, science-fiction, or fantastical elements contained in other Sigilverse titles.

El Cazador began in 2003 and ran for six issues before CrossGen's bankruptcy brought the series to a halt. The company also published a prequel one-shot, El Cazador: The Bloody Ballad of Blackjack Tom, which revealed the history of the title's main villain. El Cazador was one of the few pirate-themed comic book series in the Modern Age of comic books, and perhaps the only recent ongoing series of the genre to feature a female lead. El Cazador was written by Chuck Dixon and pencilled by Steve Epting.

Plot and characters
In the opening issue, the ship carrying Spanish noblewoman Donessa Cinzia Elena Marie Esperanza Diego-Luis Hidalgo and others of her family is attacked by a pirate captain named Blackjack Tom. Donessa is one of the few survivors of the attack. She swears to hunt down Tom and rescue his prisoners. To accomplish this, she renames her ship El Cazador ("The Hunter") and becomes a pirate herself, dubbed "Lady Sin" by her crew. The remaining issues of the series detail the beginnings of Lady Sin's quest as she forsakes her privileged past for life on the high seas.

External links
 Chuck Dixon on El Cazador: Q&A, Comics Bulletin, March 10, 2004

Historical comics
Pirate comics
Nautical comics
2003 comics debuts
2004 comics endings
Comics set in the 17th century